Bradbury 13 was a series of radio adaptations of Ray Bradbury stories. The series was created by Michael McDonough, who also adapted the stories, directed and produced the programs in 1983 and '84. Bradbury 13 aired nationally on NPR Playhouse on over 250 radio stations.  Ray Bradbury introduced each episode, and Paul Frees acted as the announcer of each of the thirteen stories. Original music was composed by Roger Hoffman and Greg Hansen.

Bradbury 13 has achieved a cult status with many fans over the years, especially with those who enjoy radio drama.

The series won a Peabody Award and two Gold Cindy awards.

Episodes 
 
 The Ravine
 Night Call, Collect
 The Veldt
 There Was An Old Woman
 Kaleidoscope
 Dark They Were And Golden Eyed
 The Screaming Woman
 A Sound Of Thunder
 The Man
 The Wind
 The Fox and The Forest
 Here There Be Tygers
 The Happiness Machine

References

External links
OTR Plot Spot: Bradbury 13 - plot summaries and reviews.
Bradbury 13 Episodes at the Internet Archive.

1980s American radio programs
American radio dramas
American science fiction radio programs
Peabody Award-winning radio programs
NPR programs
Adaptations of works by Ray Bradbury

1983 radio programme debuts 
1984 radio programme endings